Marvin Spielmann (born 23 February 1996) is a Swiss professional footballer who plays as a midfielder for Lausanne-Sport.

Club career
On 12 January 2022, Spielmann signed with Lausanne-Sport.

Personal life
Spielmann was born in Switzerland to a Swiss father and a Congolese mother.

Honours
Thun
Swiss Cup runner-up: 2018–19

Young Boys
 Swiss Super League: 2019–20
 Swiss Cup: 2019–20

References

Living people
1996 births
Swiss men's footballers
Association football midfielders
Swiss Super League players
FC Baden players
FC Aarau players
FC Wil players
FC Thun players
BSC Young Boys players
FC Lausanne-Sport players
Swiss people of Democratic Republic of the Congo descent
People from Olten
Sportspeople from the canton of Solothurn